The 2022 Teréga Open Pau–Pyrénées was a professional tennis tournament played on indoor hard courts. It was the fourth edition of the tournament which was part of the 2022 ATP Challenger Tour. It took place in Pau, France between 21 and 27 February 2022.

Singles main-draw entrants

Seeds

 1 Rankings are as of 14 February 2022.

Other entrants
The following players received wildcards into the singles main draw:
  Elliot Benchetrit
  Harold Mayot
  Jo-Wilfried Tsonga

The following players received entry into the singles main draw as alternates:
  Maxime Janvier
  Nicola Kuhn

The following players received entry from the qualifying draw:
  Antoine Escoffier
  Arthur Fils
  Ernests Gulbis
  Emilio Nava
  Ryan Peniston
  Luca Van Assche

The following players received entry as lucky losers:
  Radu Albot
  Zhang Zhizhen

Champions

Singles

 Quentin Halys def.  Vasek Pospisil 4–6, 6–4, 6–3.

Doubles

 Albano Olivetti /  David Vega Hernández def.  Karol Drzewiecki /  Kacper Żuk walkover.

References

Teréga Open Pau-Pyrénées
2022 in French tennis
February 2022 sports events in France